Bambang is one of the 28 barangays of Taguig, Metro Manila in the Philippines.

References 

Taguig
Barangays of Metro Manila